Xie Jianhua (born June 24, 1976 in Beijing) is a male Chinese judoka who competed in the 2004 Summer Olympics.

He lost in the first round of the main tournament as well as in the first round of the repechage in the lightweight class.

References
 profile

1976 births
Living people
Chinese male judoka
Judoka at the 2004 Summer Olympics
Olympic judoka of China
Sportspeople from Beijing
Judoka at the 1998 Asian Games
Asian Games competitors for China
21st-century Chinese people